"Always"  is a popular song written by Irving Berlin in 1925, as a wedding gift for his wife Ellin Mackay, whom he married in 1926, and to whom he presented the substantial royalties. 

Although legend (and Groucho Marx) claims Berlin wrote the song "Always" for The Cocoanuts, he never meant for the song to be included in that musical, and it was not. Thematically, it serves as a sequel to Berlin's earlier song "When I Lost You," which pertained to the death of his first wife Dorothy.

The song entered into the public domain on January 1, 2021.

The song is an important plot element in Noël Coward's play Blithe Spirit. It also features in the 1944 film Christmas Holiday, in which it is sung by Deanna Durbin.

Lyrics
Everything went wrong,
And the whole day long
I'd feel so blue.
For the longest while
I'd forget to smile,
Then I met you.
Now that my blue days have passed,
Now that I've found you at last -

I'll be loving you Always
With a love that's true Always.
When the things you've planned
Need a helping hand,
I will understand Always.

Always.

Days may not be fair Always,
That's when I'll be there Always.
Not for just an hour,
Not for just a day,
Not for just a year,
But Always.

I'll be loving you, oh Always
With a love that's true Always.
When the things you've planned
Need a helping hand,
I will understand Always.

Always.

Days may not be fair Always,
That's when I'll be there Always.
Not for just an hour,
Not for just a day,
Not for just a year,
But Always.

Not for just an hour,
Not for just a day,
Not for just a year,
But Always.

References 

1925 songs
Songs written by Irving Berlin
Pop standards